Federal List of Extremist Materials (Federal'nyy spisok ekstremistskikh matyerialov) is a list of works that are banned in Russian Federation, primarily based on the Russian Internet Restriction Bill. It is compiled by the Ministry of Justice of the Russian Federation. Producing, storing or distributing (including spreading via the Internet, quoting in non-academic sources, and other forms of public information, considered to be a "distribution") the materials on the list is an offense in Russia.

As of October 20, 2020, this list includes 5114 items. 106 items are already excluded from the list (although their numbers remained in the list).

The list includes publications and websites that criticize Russian authorities, such as the book FSB blows Russia up by Yuri Felshtinsky and Alexander Litvinenko (№ 2791), certain publications by Muslim theologians and Jehovah's Witnesses (№ 2904), certain antisemitic materials, the Navalny video, songs, video files, brochures and websites.

In 2012 scientology books by L. Ron Hubbard were added to the list (№ 1171, 1172, 1173).

There is a separate list of people and organizations suspected of involvement in terrorism or extremism. The list is compiled by Rosfinmonitoring.

Content

Articles, leaflets, other printed and handwritten materials 
 works written by A. A. Dobrovolsky (№ 6 - 10, 576)
 an open letter written by non-governmental organization Voice of Beslan to the President of the United States, U.S. Congress, the European Parliament, etc. (№ 589) about Beslan school hostage crisis
 text "Adolf Hitler's last will and political testament" written by unknown author (№ 3178)
 text "The worship of the devil among the Jews in our time" written by unknown author (№ 5017)

Books and brochures 
 Henry Ford. "Der internationale Jude: Ein Weltproblem" (№ 459) and version of the book, translated into Russian language - "Международное еврейство" (№ 2955)
 Adolf Hitler. "Mein Kampf" (№ 604)
 Benito Mussolini. "La dottrina del fascismo" (№ 668) and version of the book, translated into Russian language - "Доктрина фашизма" (№ 608)
 Henry Picker. "Hitlers Tischgespräche im Führerhauptquartier" (№ 711)
 Heinrich Himmler. "SS-Mann und Blutsfrage" (№ 767)
 K. V. Rodzaevsky. "The Last Will of a Russian Fascist" (№ 861)
 Jürgen Graf. "The myth about Holocaust, the truth about destiny of the Jews during World War II" (№ 973)
 Eugen Dühring. "Die Judenfrage als Frage der Rassenschadlichkeit fur Existenz, Sitte und Kultur der Volker, mit einer weltgeschichtlichen Antwort" (№ 979)
 Richard Wagner. "Das Judenthum in der Musik" (№ 1204)
 V. A. Prussakov. "Hitler without lies and myths" (№ 1596)
 Édouard Drumont. "La France juive". (№ 1791)
 Gottfried Feder. "Das Programm der NSDAP und seine weltanschaulichen Grundlagen" (№ 2000)
 Joseph Goebbels. Michael: A German Destiny in Diary Form (№ 2385)
 Alfred Rosenberg. The Myth of the Twentieth Century (№ 2532)
 M. S. Martsinkevich. "Реструкт!" (№ 2572)
 Yu. G. Felshtinsky and A. V. Litvinenko. "FSB blows Russia up" (№ 2791)
 B. V. Stomakhin. "Violence as a method" (№ 5004)

Movies and videos 
 "Der ewige Jude" (№ 5)
 video entitled "ISIS declaration to President Vladimir Putin" (№ 4095)
 video "Putin publicly, at a meeting of Jews admitted that he is a Jew", lasting 02 minutes 15 seconds (№ 4933)
 video titled "Evidence. Putin is building the Khazaria", starting with the words: "Russia is captured by Jews, Putin is the President of the Khazar Republic", ending with the words: "Think about which nation in Russia he cares about?" (№ 4969)

Pictures and images 
 A poster depicting A. Hitler in NSDAP uniform with the words "Happy Birthday, National Socialist. 14/88. Be good and kill [censored] today" (№ 2702)
 A poster depicting a man who looks like President of the Russian Federation V. V. Putin, on whose face makeup is done with eyelashes and lips are painted, which, as conceived by the author / authors of the poster, should serve as a hint of the allegedly non-standard sexual orientation of the President of the Russian Federation (№ 4071)

Poetry 
 A. M. Byvshev's poem "Ukrainian patriots" (№ 2596), where he disagreed with Russian intervention in Donbass and supported military resistance by Ukrainians.

Songs 
 song "Cry of the Nordic Blood" by Kolovrat (№ 791)
 song "Nigger" by Korrozia Metalla (№ 2384)
 song "Nazis. Hitler's blessed party" (№ 2426)
 song "Skinhead" by Korrozia Metalla (№ 2797)
 song "Heil Führer" by Korrozia Metalla (№ 3012)
 song "The White Race" by Kolovrat (№ 3760)
 song "Racial fidelity" by Kolovrat (№ 3955)
 20 songs by Chechen poet Timur Mutsurayev

References

External links
 Federal List of Extremist Materials  (Russian)
 Anti-censorship links to "extremist materials" (Russian)
 Anti-censorship links to "extremist materials" (Russian, a different site)
 Federal Law on Counteracting Extremist Activity (English)

Censorship in Russia
Blacklisting
Lists of banned works
Cultural lists